Oregostoma nigripes is a species of beetle in the family Cerambycidae. It was described by Audinet-Serville in 1833.

References

Rhinotragini
Beetles described in 1833